The Apostolic Vicariate of Rodrigues is a Roman Catholic apostolic vicariate located on the island of Rodrigues in Mauritius.

History
 October 31, 2002: Established as Apostolic Vicariate of Rodrigues from the Diocese of Port-Louis

Leadership
 Vicar Apostolics of Rodrigues (Roman rite)
 Bishop Alain Harel (October 31, 2002 – September 10, 2020), later appointed as Bishop of Port Victoria.

References

External links
 GCatholic.org
 Catholic Hierarchy 

Catholic Church in Mauritius
Christian organizations established in 2002
Rodrigues
Apostolic vicariates
Roman Catholic dioceses and prelatures established in the 21st century
2002 establishments in Mauritius